Kiwitachys is a genus of ground beetles in the family Carabidae. There are at least two described species in Kiwitachys, found in New Zealand.

Species
These two species belong to the genus Kiwitachys:
 Kiwitachys antarcticus (Bates, 1874)
 Kiwitachys latipennis (Sharp, 1886)

References

Trechinae